Ritani is a fine jewelry company specializing in engagement rings and bridal jewelry. The company is based in New York. Initially, a wholesale jewelry brand, customers are able to design a custom engagement ring online.

History

In 2012, chief investor Cantor Fitzgerald invested $15 million in Ritani, following the Julius Klein Group selling their stake in the company. In January 2014, Ritani was selected for the Forbes list of America's Most Promising Companies for its unique "clicks and bricks" model that blends online shopping and brick-and-mortar stores.

In June 2014, Ritani announced that the former Blue Nile CEO Diane Irvine had joined the company's board of directors. Ritani's independent jewelry store partners network has over 180 locations across the United States and Canada. The focus of "clicks and bricks" is to assist the customer in ring design, Ritani also offers a free in-store preview. Ritani has an inventory of over 60,000 diamonds ranging in price from $184 to $1.7 million.

References

External links 
 Ritani Website

Online jewelry retailers of the United States